in modern Norwegian or  in Danish and older Norwegian spelling is a term with several distinct meanings in Nordic history.

Fief-holder

The term  traditionally referred to a holder of a royal fief in Denmark and Norway. As the fiefs were renamed amt in 1662, the term  was replaced with amtmand. In Norway these offices evolved into the modern fylkesmann office.

Modern police officer

See also
 Sheriff

References 

Law enforcement in Norway
Law enforcement titles
Law enforcement occupations
Police ranks